The following is a comprehensive list of American country music group, Lady A's concert tours. Lady A has embarked on five headlining concerts tours, one co-headlining concert tour, and one Las Vegas residency.

Need You Now Tour
The Need You Now Tour was the first headlining concert tour by Lady Antebellum, supporting their sophomore studio album Need You Now. The tour began on September 20, 2010. David Nail was the opening act.

Own the Night Tour

The Own the Night Tour was the second headlining concert tour by Lady Antebellum, supporting their third studio album Own the Night. It began on November 11, 2011, in Knoxville, Tennessee and ended on October 3, 2012, in Sydney, Australia. This was their first world tour visiting Europe and Australia.

Background
The tour was announced on August 15, 2011. The second leg of the tour was announced on October 18, 2011. The tour visited North America, Europe and Australia.

Opening acts

Frankie Ballard 
The Band Perry 
Luke Bryan 
Edens Edge 
Gloriana 
Josh Kelley 
Randy Montana 
Kacey Musgraves 
David Nail 
Thomas Rhett 
Darius Rucker 
Thompson Square

Setlist
{{hidden
| headercss = background: #ccccff; font-size: 100%; width: 59%;
| contentcss = text-align: left; font-size: 100%; width: 75%;
| header = 2011 Setlist
| content = 
"We Owned the Night"
"Stars Tonight"
"Our Kind of Love"
"Dancin' Away With My Heart"
"Wanted You More"
"Love Don't Live Here"
"When You Were Mine"
"Hello World"
"American Honey"
"Midnight Rider"  
"Singing Me Home"
"As You Turn Away"
"Just a Kiss"
"Perfect Day"
"I Run to You"
"Need You Now"
Encore
"Lookin' for a Good Time"
}}
{{hidden
| headercss = background: #ccccff; font-size: 100%; width: 59%;
| contentcss = text-align: left; font-size: 100%; width: 75%;
| header = 2012 Setlist
| content = 
"We Owned the Night"
"Stars Tonight"
"Our Kind of Love"
"Dancin' Away with My Heart"
"Wanted You More"
"Perfect Day"
"Love Don't Live Here"
"Just a Kiss"
"Hello World"
"Midnight Rider" 
"American Honey"
"I Run to You"
"Lookin' for a Good Time" 
Encore
"Need You Now"
}}

Tour dates

Touring band
Clint Chandler – Mandolin
Dennis Edwards – Bass guitar
Jason "Silm" Gambill – Guitar
Jonathan Long – Accordion, musical director, piano, tambourine 
Chris Tyrrell – Drums

Tour documentary
The tour documentary was filmed on June 27, 2012, in North Little Rock, Arkansas at the Verizon Arena.

Critical reception
Mike Hammond, Program Director for WIVK out of Knoxville says, "Lady A has taken their tour to the next level." Their energy, enthusiasm, stage presence, big screen, the music, the stage, etc.This is definitely on the must see list this fall."

Take Me Downtown Tour

 
The Take Me Downtown Tour was the third headlining tour by Lady Antebellum. The tour began on January 10, 2014, in Peoria, Illinois and ended on September 28, 2014, in the Dominican Republic. The first leg of the tour was announced on July 2013  and the second leg was announced on August 27, 2013. The tour was in support of their fifth studio album, Golden.

The first leg of the tour was originally going to begin on November 8, 2013, but was postponed until January 10, 2014. Lady Antebellum's comment about the postponement was, "To accommodate the new release and in order give you guys the best show possible, we've had to move things around on our tour schedule." The first leg visited sixty cities. It was also announced on the Lady Antebellum site on January 17, 2014, that the tour would be extended to eighty dates. Those dates were added to the summer portion of the tour. On May 19, 2014, it was announced that the group would headline a show on the beach in Atlantic City, New Jersey on August 3 as part of free beach concerts.

Opening acts

Kip Moore 
Kacey Musgraves 
Billy Currington 
Jana Kramer 
Joe Nichols 
David Nail 
Alex & Sierra

Setlist
The following setlist is representative of the shows on select dates. It is not representative of all shows for the duration of the tour.
{{hidden
| headercss = background: #ccccff; font-size: 100%; width: 59%;
| contentcss = text-align: left; font-size: 100%; width: 75%;
| header = North America leg 1 setlist
| content =
"Compass" 
Better Off Now (That You're Gone)"
"Our Kind of Love"
"Get to Me"
"Just a Kiss"
"Love Don't Live Here"
"American Honey"
"It Ain't Pretty"
"I Run to You"
"Dancin' Away with My Heart"
"Wanted You More"
"Goodbye Town"
"Hello World"
"And the Radio Played"
"Fly Away in the Morning" 
"Downtown"
"Lookin' for a Good Time"
"We Owned the Night"
Encore
"Need You Now"
"Wake Me Up" 
"Cups" 
}}
{{hidden
| headercss = background: #ccccff; font-size: 100%; width: 59%;
| contentcss = text-align: left; font-size: 100%; width: 75%;
| header = North America leg 2 setlist
| content =
"Compass"
"Better Off Now (That You're Gone)"
"Our Kind of Love"
"Bartender"
"Just a Kiss"
"Perfect Day"
"American Honey"
"It Ain't Pretty"
"I Run to You"
"Dancin' Away with My Heart" 
"Wanted You More"
"Goodbye Town"
"Hello World"
"Love Don't Live Here" 
"It's a Great Day to Be Alive" 
"Downtown"
"Lookin' for a Good Time"
"We Owned the Night"
Encore
"Need You Now"
"Wake Me Up" (Avicii cover)
"Cups" 
}}

Tour dates

 
Cancelled tour dates
Springfield, Missouri
Southaven, Mississippi
Allegan, Michigan (due to the birth of Dave Haywood's baby)
 
Rescheduled tour dates
Moved from March 27 at Chesapeake Energy Arena to June 27 at Downtown OKC Airpark.

Wheels Up Tour
The Wheels Up Tour was the fourth headlining concert tour by Lady Antebellum, supporting their sixth studio album 747. It began on February 28, 2015, in Oslo, Norway and ended on October 3, 2015, in Las Vegas, Nevada.

You Look Good World Tour
The You Look Good World Tour was the fifth headlining concert tour by Lady Antebellum, supporting their seventh studio album Heart Break. It began on May 26, 2017, in Bakersfield, California and ended on October 15, 2017,in Johannesburg, South Africa. This was the first tour that they visited Africa.

Summer Plays On Tour

The Summer Plays On Tour is a current co-headlining concert tour by Lady Antebellum and American singer Darius Rucker. It supports their seventh studio album Heart Break, and Rucker's seventh studio album When Was the Last Time. It began on July 19, 2018, in Toronto, Canada and ended on October 6, 2018, in Bristow, Virginia.

Background and show
The tour was first announced in January 2018. Charles Kelley of Lady Antebellum and Rucker both expressed their excitement of touring with each other. Kelley saying, "Darius is one of our closet friends, and so we just feel really excited to get to share this tour and those memories on and off stage with him."

Both acts perform full sets along with a few collaborations.

Opening act
Russell Dickerson

Setlists

Lady Antebellum 
"You Look Good"
"Bartender"
"I Run to You"
"New Rules"/"Heart Break"
"Dancin' Away with My Heart"
"Compass"/"Meet in the Middle" 
"Our Kind of Love"
"American Honey"
"Raining on Sunday" 
"Just a Kiss"
"Downtown"
"Lookin' for a Good Time"
"Need You Now"
"We Owned the Night"
"Hold My Hand" 
"Strawberry Wine" 
"Love Don't Live Here" 

Darius Rucker
"Homegrown Honey"
"Radio"
"Don't Think I Don't Think About It"
"This"
"If I Told You"
"Alright"
"For the First Time"
"Let Her Cry" 
"It Won't Be Like This for Long"
"Come Back Song"
"Hands on Me"
"Straight to Hell" 
"Only Wanna Be With You" 
"Wagon Wheel"

Tour dates

What A Song Can Do Tour

The What a Song Can Do Tour was Lady A's sixth headlining concert tour. It began on July 29, 2021, in Uncasville, Connecticut and finished on October 10, 2021, in Gilford, New Hampshire. This was their first headlining tour since 2017, and first arena and amphitheater tour since 2018. The tour was in support of the ninth studio album What a Song Can Do.

Opening acts
Carly Pearce
Niko Moon
Tenille Arts

Tour dates

Request a Line Tour

The Request a Line Tour is Lady A's upcoming seventh headlinig concert tour,

Opening act
Dave Barnes

Concert residencies

References

Lady Antebellum